Faramarz Fekri from the Georgia Institute of Technology, Atlanta was named Fellow of the Institute of Electrical and Electronics Engineers (IEEE) in 2016 for contributions to coding theory and its applications.

References 

Fellow Members of the IEEE
Living people
Georgia Tech faculty
21st-century American engineers
Year of birth missing (living people)
Place of birth missing (living people)
American electrical engineers